Aao Wish Karein (English: "Come, Make a Wish") is a 2009 Indian fantasy comedy film directed by Glen Barreto. The film features Aftab Shivdasani and Aamna Shariff in lead roles.

It released on 13 November 2009. It is remake of 1988 English film Big.

Cast

 Aftab Shivdasani....as Mickey Mehra (adult)
 Aamna Shariff....as Mitika
 Johny Lever....as  Hitchcock
 Rati Agnihotri.... as Nisha V. Mehra
 Yatin Karyekar.... as Vikas Mehra
 Tiku Talsania ....as Tiku Malhotra
 Suhasini Mulay.... as Bonny's Daadi
 Rishabh Sharma .... as Mickey (young)
 Rohan Shah.... as Bonny (young)
 Pushtiie Shakti.... as Shruti Mukherjee  
 Shah Rukh Khan.... as Narrator (voice)
 Riteish Deshmukh.... as Bonny (adult) (Special Appearance)

Critical response

Anupama Chopra in her NDTV review gave it 0.5 out 5 stars, said "All I asked for was a passably decent film but Aao Wish Karein couldn't even manage that. Steer Clear". Nikhat Kazmi from The Times of India gave it 2 out 5 stars. Taran Adarsh in sify.com gave 1.5 stars out of 5 and said that the movie has some endearing moments, but not enough to salvage it and is anything but a fairy tale.

Soundtrack
 "Kuch Aisa" - Xulfi
 "Kuch Aisa" (Sad) - Xulfi
 "Reh Jaane Do" - Xulfi
 "Sab Yahaan Hain" - Kunal Ganjawala
 "Sabse Peeche Hum Khade" - Kunal Ganjawala
 "Sabse Peeche Hum Khade" (reprise) - Kunal Ganjawala
 "Sabse Peeche Kyon Khade" - Sunidhi Chauhan
 "Tum Mere Ho" - Kunal Ganjawala & Sunidhi Chauhan

References

External links

2009 films
2000s Hindi-language films
2000s fantasy drama films
2000s science fiction drama films
Indian fantasy drama films
Films about wish fulfillment
Indian science fiction drama films
Indian remakes of American films
2009 drama films
2009 fantasy films